Tony LeMans was an American singer and songwriter, associated with Prince and signed to Prince's Paisley Park Records.

Biography
Tony LeMans grew up, Tony MansFortier in Santa Monica, California, United States. He attended Will Rogers Elementary School, John Adams Jr High, Santa Monica High School and Olympic High School. It was at John Adams that he met Lenny Kravitz who was just beginning to study music. After dropping out of Olympic High School, Tony changed his surname to LeMans due to his fathers love of the vehicle with that name. He then briefly worked with Kravitz on his Romeo Blue project. However, due to personal differences, they had a falling out and went separate ways.

LeMans left Los Angeles for Minneapolis and met Prince shortly after arriving there. Paisley Park Records released Tony's first and only album, "Tony Lemans" in 1989. Šly Stone (Higher than High) and George Clinton of Parlament,( Rhythm Rocker) were involved in the creation as well. His album peaked at #58 on the Billboard R&B Album chart. Three singles were released ("Higher Than High", "Cookie Crumbles", and "Forever More") without much chart success.  His only live performance was on New years eve, 1989 at the San Francisco Moscone Center, with his newly formed tour band: Jamie Chezz, Kelley Kelley, Steven Menconi, T. Keanini, Michael Whitfield and Shayne Soentpiet. Not long after, the tour was put on hold and he worked on separate projects with his producer, David Gamson. Tony co-wrote songs with Donny Osmond as well as Eddie Murphy. Although Prince often worked behind the scenes on albums for his label, he officially played no role in this one. David Gamson was the main producer.
  
In the early 1990s, LeMans began work on a second album. Prince offered him a song called "Fuschia Light" that was intended to go on the album. The album was never completed due to LeMan's death. In addition to his own work, LeMans also produced a song with David Gamson for Donny Osmond's comeback album, Sure Looking Good. 

LeMans, an avid motorcyclist, (he loved Harley-Davidson) died in an accident while driving in Malibu, California on June 24, 1992. He was to be married the next day to Deborah Matthews, Vanity's sister.

Discography

 Tony LeMans (1989, Paisley Park Records)

References

External links
Story by his manager

1992 deaths
Year of birth missing
American dance musicians
American male pop singers
Paisley Park Records artists
American contemporary R&B singers